Araara Island is an island in the Northland Region of New Zealand.
It is one of the Hen and Chicken Islands, lying immediately south and east of Mauitaha (West Chicken).

See also

 List of islands of New Zealand
 List of islands
 Desert island

References

Uninhabited islands of New Zealand
Islands of the Northland Region